Jacqueline "Jackie" Johnson (born January 23, 1980) is a former American weather forecaster and television personality, best known for her work on KCBS-TV news in Los Angeles, California. She could also be heard for many years on the CBS-owned radio station KNX1070 in Los Angeles, doing periodic weather forecast updates.

Biography
Johnson was born in Plymouth, Michigan. She initially attended the University of South Alabama, concentrating on meteorology. Johnson eventually graduated from Middle Tennessee State University with a degree in broadcast journalism. She then moved to Florida to work as a reporter and weekend weather anchor for WCTV-TV in Tallahassee, and then was employed in similar roles at WSVN-TV in Miami. After a move to Los Angeles, Johnson was the prime-time weather anchor for KCAL 9 News until 2010, and then occupied the same position at KCBS-TV, their sister station in the city, until retiring in 2018.

Johnson is divorced from former National Football League player John Kidd. She remarried in 2016 and gave birth to a daughter on January 12, 2018.

Film and television
Johnson has appeared in a handful of films and television shows, typically playing a meteorologist or news anchor. In 2012, she appeared as herself in the movie Battleship.

References

External links
 CBS2/KCAL9 On-Air Talent Biographies

 Jackie Johnson Official  Web site 
Jackie Johnson (JackieJohnsonLA) on Twitter
Jackie Johnson's Facebook Page
http://radaronline.com/exclusives/2015/04/jackie-johnson-divorce-nfl-star/
https://web.archive.org/web/20150415234031/http://www.naughtygossip.com/jared-leto-has-a-new-love-see-who-it-is/

1980 births
Living people
People from Plymouth, Michigan
Middle Tennessee State University alumni
University of South Alabama alumni
Weather presenters